= Jai Prakash Singh =

Indian politician

Jai Prakash Singh is an activist and politician from Uttar Pradesh, India. Singh is an ex-member and former vice president of Bahujan Samaj Party. Currently He is the President of West Bengal BSP

BSP President Mayawati removed Singh from the posts of vice-president and national coordinator after he made personal comments against Congress president Rahul Gandhi and his mother Sonia Gandhi while addressing party workers.
